The Linux Programming Interface: A Linux and UNIX System Programming Handbook is a book written by Michael Kerrisk, which documents the APIs of the Linux kernel and of the GNU C Library (glibc).

Book
It covers a wide array of topics dealing with the Linux operating system and operating systems in general, as well as providing a brief history of Unix and how it led  to the creation of Linux. It provides many samples of code written in the C programming language, and provides learning exercises at the end of many chapters. Kerrisk is a former writer for the Linux Weekly News and the current maintainer for the Linux man pages project.

The Linux Programming Interface is widely regarded as the definitive work on Linux system programming and has been translated into several languages. Jake Edge, writer for LWN.net, in his review of the book, said, "I found it to be extremely useful and expect to return to it frequently. Anyone who has an interest in programming for Linux will likely feel the same way." Federico Lucifredi, the product manager for the SUSE Linux Enterprise and openSUSE distributions, also praised the book, saying that "The Linux Programming Encyclopedia would have been a perfectly adequate title for it in my opinion" and called the book "…a work of encyclopedic breadth and depth, spanning in great detail concepts usually spread in a multitude of medium-sized books…" Lennart Poettering, the software engineer best known for PulseAudio and systemd, advises people to "get yourself a copy of The Linux Programming Interface, ignore everything it says about POSIX compatibility and hack away your amazing Linux software".

At FOSDEM 2016 Michael Kerrisk, the author of The Linux Programming Interface, explained some of the issues with the Linux kernel's user-space API he and others perceive. It is littered with design errors: APIs which are non-extensible, unmaintainable, overly complex, limited-purpose, violations of standards, and inconsistent. Most of those mistakes can't be fixed because doing so would break the ABI that the kernel presents to user-space binaries.

See also 

 Linux kernel interfaces
 Programming Linux Games

References

External links
 The Linux Programming Interface at the publisher's (No Starch Press) Website
 The Linux Programming Interface Description at Kerrisk's Website
 API changes
 The Linux Programming Interface Traditional Chinese Translation

Computer programming books
Books about Linux
2010 non-fiction books
No Starch Press books
Interfaces of the Linux kernel